The skandola (literally meaning "dwelling of evil") is a ritual talismanic seal used by Mandaeans to protect against evil.

Description
The skandola is an iron ring with a chain attached to an iron knife. It is used as a sacred talismanic seal. It is used to seal graves and also newborn babies on their navels. During wedding ceremonies, a priest gives the skandola to the bridegroom. There are incised depictions of the following animals:

Lion, representing Krun
Scorpion, representing Hag
Black snake or serpent, representing Ur
Wasp or hornet

E. S. Drower notes parallels with Mithraic bas-reliefs, Yazidism, Iranian artistic symbols, and others. A Mandaean priest told Drower that the skandola was originally brought by Hibil Ziwa from the World of Darkness as he was taking Ruha along with him (a narrative found in Book 5, Chapter 1 of the Right Ginza).

See also
Talisman
Hamsa

References

Mandaean religious objects
Mandaic words and phrases
Seals (insignia)
Talismans
Objects believed to protect from evil

Snakes in religion
Lions in religion
Insects in religion